Cayle Vivian Chernin (December 4, 1947 – February 18, 2011) was a Canadian actress, writer, and producer born in Glace Bay, on Cape Breton Island, Nova Scotia.  She began her career with a small, but important, role in Donald Shebib's Canadian film Goin' Down the Road (1970). She later produced award-winning documentaries, and acted in film, television and theatre; when she returned to acting in the 2000s, having become better known as a filmmaker she initially used the stage names Cayle-Lorraine Sinclair or Lorraine Sinclair in her acting roles, before reverting back to Cayle Chernin in the late 2000s.

Chernin had ovarian cancer which was rapidly spreading, but she died of a virus she caught in hospital on February 18, 2011, at the age of 63. Diagnosed in June 2010, she filmed a sequel to Goin' Down the Road titled Down the Road Again, in October 2010. The film was theatrically released posthumously in October 2011. Co-star Jayne Eastwood stated that Chernin put off cancer treatment in order to complete the film. Contrary to Eastwood's quote, when Cayle Chernin was diagnosed, she rejected chemotherapy, embarking on alternative cancer treatments during the course of her illness.
Chernin resided in Toronto, Ontario at the time of her death.

Filmography

References

External links

1947 births
2011 deaths
Canadian film actresses
Film producers from Nova Scotia
Deaths from ovarian cancer
Deaths from cancer in Ontario
People from Glace Bay
Actresses from Nova Scotia
Canadian women film producers
Canadian television actresses